Esteban Laureano Maradona (born Esperanza, provincia de Santa Fe, Argentina 4 July 1895 – died Rosario, Argentina January 14, 1995) was a country medical doctor, naturalist, writer, and philanthropist. Maradona practiced medicine in the village of Estanislao del Campo, in the remote province of Formosa, for 50 years. Maradona moved to Paraguay during the Chaco War, where he was appointed director of Asuncion's Naval Hospital. He also worked with indigenous communities on economic, cultural, humanitarian, and social issues.

Maradona was author of numerous scientific works on anthropology and flora and fauna.

Publications 
Some of Maradona's approximately 20 books have not yet been published, though in 1994 the Argentine Congress passed a resolution to edit and donate copies of Maradona's books to public libraries to further his legacy.

Published
 A través de la selva
 Recuerdos Campesinos.
 Una planta providencial (El yacón).

Unpublished
 Animales cuadrúpedos americanos (three volumes with illustrations)
 Aves (también tres volúmenes con ilustraciones).
 Dendrología (cinco volúmenes con representaciones gráficas de las especies).
 El problema de la lepra. Profilaxis y colonización.
 El problema del vinal. Propiedades, usos y distribución en Formosa.
 Historia de la ganadería argentina
 Historia de los obreros de las Ciencias Naturales (de botánica y zoología americanas)
 La ciudad muerta (history of the first years of the city of Concepción del río Bermejo).
 Páginas sueltas (periodístico)
 Plantas cauchígenas
 Vocabulario toba-pilagá (more than 3,000 words translated into Spanish).

References
  
El otro Maradona, el de los logros que realmente importan by Miguel Ángel Núñez 

1895 births
1995 deaths
Argentine male writers
People from Esperanza, Santa Fe
Argentine philanthropists
Argentine general practitioners
Argentine naturalists
People of the Chaco War
20th-century philanthropists
20th-century naturalists